The Mayor of Methuen is the head of the municipal government in Methuen, Massachusetts.

List of mayors

External links

 Our Campaigns website-Dennis Dizoglio
 Our Campaigns website-Sharon Pollard
 Our Campaigns website-William Manzi
 Our Campaigns website-Stephen Zanni

Methuen